The Tangiwai disaster occurred at 10:21 p.m. on 24 December 1953 when a railway bridge over the Whangaehu River collapsed beneath an express passenger train at Tangiwai, North Island, New Zealand. The locomotive and the first six carriages derailed into the river, killing 151 people. The subsequent board of inquiry found that the accident was caused by the collapse of the tephra dam holding back nearby Mount Ruapehu's crater lake, creating a rapid mudflow (lahar) in the Whangaehu River, which destroyed one of the bridge piers at Tangiwai only minutes before the train reached the bridge. The volcano itself was not otherwise erupting at the time. The disaster remains New Zealand's worst rail accident.

Bridge collapse

On 24 December 1953, the 3 p.m. express train from Wellington to Auckland consisted of a KA class steam locomotive hauling eleven carriages: five second class, four first-class, a guard's van and a postal van. There was no evidence presented to the board of inquiry regarding any calculations made or indications of the speed of locomotive 949 either as it approached the incident site or at the time of the incident.

Approaching the bridge over the Whangaehu River at Tangiwai, in response either to Cyril Ellis, a passerby, standing by the track and waving a torch or on seeing the condition of the bridge, driver Charles Parker shut off steam and initiated an emergency air brake application, while his fireman, Lance Redman, shut off the oil supply valve for the fire. These actions can be assumed from the state of locomotive cab controls observed following the incident. However, these actions could not stop the train from running onto the bridge, which collapsed, sending the locomotive, its tender, and five second class carriages into the river. The leading first-class carriage teetered on the edge of the bridge before its coupling to the rest of the train snapped and it, too, rolled into the river. The remaining three first-class carriages, the guard's van, and the postal van remained on the track.

The death toll of 151 consisted of Parker, Redman, 148 second-class passengers, and one first-class passenger. Twenty of the bodies were never found and were presumed to have been carried  downriver to the ocean. Among the dead was Nerissa Love, the fiancée of cricketer Bob Blair, who was playing in a test match in South Africa at the time. On going out to bat after his loss, Blair received a standing ovation.

Aftermath

After the train crashed, Ellis informed the train's guard, William Inglis, of what had happened and the two entered the sixth carriage, then still balanced precariously on the bridge's edge, in an attempt to save passengers. While they were in the carriage, it tumbled off the bridge and Ellis and Inglis, with the assistance of passenger John Holman, smashed a window and helped passengers out of the carriage. Of the carriage's twenty-four occupants, only one died, a girl who was trapped in her seat and drowned.

These included soldiers from Waiouru Army Camp, radio operators from Irirangi Naval Communications Station and workmen from the Waiouru Ministry of Works (MOW) camp. By midnight the first survivors had been admitted into the Waiouru Camp Hospital, and by 4 am the following day, Christmas morning, the first bodies had been transported to a makeshift mortuary at the camp.

Prime Minister Sidney Holland arrived at Tangiwai early on Christmas morning after a high-speed drive down from Auckland. He coordinated the rescue work by railway, military, police, MOW, local farmers and undertakers. While the New Zealand Army led efforts near the accident site, local farmers recovered bodies further down the Whangaehu River; at Fields Track, Mount View, Mangamahu, Kauangaroa, Whangaehu village and the river mouth. The bodies were taken by truck to Wanganui and thence by rail to Waiouru, where police and undertakers identified them. Local people recovered 60 bodies from the Mangamāhū section of the river over the following few days, although twenty bodies were never recovered and are thought to have washed out to sea.

For their actions, Ellis and Holman received the George Medal in the 1954 New Zealand bravery awards. Inglis and a passing traveller, Arthur Dewar Bell, both received the British Empire Medal for actions that saved fifteen lives. Queen Elizabeth II and the Duke of Edinburgh were visiting New Zealand on their first royal tour when the disaster occurred. The Queen made her Christmas broadcast from Auckland, finishing with a message of sympathy to the people of New Zealand. The Duke of Edinburgh attended a state funeral for many of the victims.

Public inquiry
A board of inquiry was appointed to look into the cause of the accident; this sat in public from 26 January until 2 April and reported on 23 April 1954. The bridge had eight piers and seven spans. After the accident, four piers had been damaged and five spans dislodged. The board found that a lahar from Mount Ruapehu had removed the fourth pier a few minutes before the train started to cross the bridge. Their subsequent report stated: 
"The relative positions of the 44 ft. girder (span 3) and the first car (A. 1907) dictate that the girder was removed before the passage of the first car. This girder must therefore have been removed either before the locomotive arrived on the span or during the passage of the locomotive and tender over the span. If this girder was removed during the passage of the locomotive, there is a strong inference that some part of the heavy structure of the locomotive would have hit girder No. 2. There is, however, no evidence of extensive damage to girder No. 2, and it may therefore be inferred that girder No. 3 was not removed during the passage of the locomotive across it. Span 3 was therefore carried away before the locomotive entered upon it and there is a strong inference that Pier No. 4 was carried away before the train passed over it. This would also cause span 4 to be carried away. There is also a strong inference that Pier 4 was removed by the lahar and that this caused the accident." The bridge had been designed for foreseeable flooding and for previous lahars that had different characteristics to the 1953 lahar, the forces of which had been unpredictable.

The official report had this to say about the facts as presented to it: "Much of the evidence submitted relating to the order of events at the crucial time of the destruction of the bridge and of the train and of the conditions about the bridge, including the bed of the river, rests on inferences on which the Board is asked to make findings of fact. It seems unavoidable that the reconstruction of some events and circumstances must rest on such a foundation..." The Board also stated, "...it is appropriate to record that in respect of every member of the train crew of train No. 626 and of every member of the Way and Works and Traffic Branches whose duties can be regarded as being involved in the accident there has been no failure to exercise reasonable care or fulfill any duty or responsibility reasonably to be expected of that member in the circumstances leading to the accident. The Board thinks this view can properly apply also to Constable Smidt."

Legacy

Following the disaster, the New Zealand Railways Department installed a lahar warning system upstream in the river to alert train control to high river flows. The early warning system installed in 1999 measures the river level using radar and sends the level to the Network Control Centre at Wellington railway station via an RF link to Waiouru and then via the signalling network to Wellington. If the river changes level, an alarm is triggered which alerts staff to the fact. If the level indicates a significant risk, the control centre sets the signals on either side of the Tangiwai bridge to danger and warns trains in the area to stay clear by radio. The system has a failsafe feature which automatically sends a fault signal to the control centre. Since 2002, it has also been backed up by the Eastern Ruapehu Lahar Alarm and Warning System (ERLAWS).

A lahar of similar magnitude to the one from 1953 occurred on 18 March 2007. The early warning systems worked as planned, stopping trains and motorists at Tangiwai before the lahar hit. The newer bridges held up to the lahar and after inspection trains resumed operation.

Dramatisations
The 2002 documentary, The Truth About Tangiwai, directed by New Zealand filmmaker David Sims examines events surrounding the tragedy.

In 2011, a television film about the disaster was made by Lippy Pictures for Television New Zealand. Entitled Tangiwai: A Love Story, it follows the disaster and the love story between Blair and Love (portrayed by Ryan O'Kane and Rose McIver respectively). It premiered on TV One on 14 August 2011. A play written and performed by Auckland actor Jonny Brugh, The Second Test, tells the same story from Blair's perspective, emphasizing his commitment to continue playing after hearing of the tragedy.

References

Citations

Sources

Archived at archive.org. Retrieved 5 November 2012

Further reading

External links

NZHistory.net.nz feature – includes film and sound
Danger Ahead! – Historic Railway Disasters article
Pathe newsreel 

Railway accidents and incidents in New Zealand
Derailments in New Zealand
Railway accidents in 1953
Dam failures in Oceania
1953 in New Zealand
History of Manawatū-Whanganui
Bridge disasters in New Zealand
Bridge disasters caused by scour damage
December 1953 events in New Zealand
Lahars
1953 disasters in New Zealand